The 2014 Tour de Pologne was the 71st running of the Tour de Pologne cycling stage race. It started on 3 August in Gdańsk and ended on 9 August in Kraków, after seven stages. It was the twentieth race of the 2014 UCI World Tour season.

Participating teams
As the Tour de Pologne was a UCI World Tour event, all eighteen UCI ProTeams were invited automatically and obligated to send a squad. Along with Team Poland – the Polish national team – two other squads were given wildcard places into the race, and as such, formed the event's 21-team peloton.

The twenty-one teams that competed in the race were:

Schedule

Stages

Stage 1

3 August 2014 — Gdańsk to Bydgoszcz, 

In line with the 25th anniversary of Poland moving from a communist to a democratic country and being freed from Soviet grasp, the 71st Tour de Pologne started in Gdańsk, a city famous for being the home of the Solidarność union, largely responsible for the political changes. The first stage was predominantly flat, featuring just one categorised climb, a third category ascent in Bydgoszcz, on the second of three  loops ending the stage. During the stage, there were also special sprints in Pruszcz Gdański and Malbork, as well as two intermediate sprints offering points for the intermediate sprints classification in Kwidzyn and Unisław. It was largely expected that this stage would be won by a sprinter, who would take the first yellow jersey.

The five riders built up an advantage that reached 15 minutes over the peloton. The riders faced extreme temperatures at the start, the mercury reaching . Gradek took maximum points at the intermediate sprint in Kwidzyn, whilst Engoulvent won at the Unisław sprint. With both riders having four points on their tally, the battle for the first navy blue jersey in the intermediate sprints classification would continue until the line.

Eventually, the peloton started to minimise the gap to the breakaway, but it was then that a torrential downpour hit the race, causing at least one tree to fall over and block part of the road and at least 4 crashes, including 1 in the breakaway. Paterski attacked on the streets of Bydgoszcz, trying to take the first fuchsia jersey. He succeeded, with only him, Engoulvent and Krizek remaining on the last lap. Paterski led the way to try and take the stage victory but was caught under the flamme rouge. A sprint finish was ensured, with 's Yauheni Hutarovich taking the stage victory, and the yellow and white jerseys with it. As he came higher in the stage, Engoulvent beat Gradek to the navy blue jersey.

Stage 2

4 August 2014 — Toruń to Warsaw, 

Like the previous stage, this stage was suited towards the sprinters. Heading eastwards, there were no categorised climbs, ensuring that 's Maciej Paterski would keep the fuchsia jersey. Also like the previous stage, there were two intermediate sprints, coming in Kampinos and in Stare Babice, ahead of a  loop in Warsaw, to be completed three times.

Further like in the first stage, the breakaway was formed just after the start. Petr Vakoč of  attacked first and was shortly joined by Bartłomiej Matysiak and Przemysław Kasperkiewicz. With  pacing the leader, Yauheni Hutarovich, the lead of the breakaway topped four minutes in the early running. However, at the time of the intermediate sprints (both were located towards the end of the stage), the lead of the trio reached seven minutes and the peloton was in no rush to chase them. Vakoč attacked at the second sprint (taking full points at both, thus taking the intermediate sprints' navy blue jersey) and rode solo into Warsaw, whilst the peloton tried to quickly catch him, failing to do so. Vakoč took the victory with a 21" advantage over the peloton, brought home by Michael Matthews. Thanks to the victory, Vakoč became the leader of the race. Hutarovich finished fifth, thus keeping the white jersey and second place, with a 27" deficit to Vakoč because of time bonuses.

Stage 3

5 August 2014 — Kielce to Rzeszów, 

Just like the previous two stages, this stage was aimed at the sprinters, although noticeably shorter. The parcours of  featured one intermediate sprint in Głogów Małopolski and one third category climb on the streets of Rzeszów. A  loop was also to be completed twice ahead of an expected sprint finish.

Again, the breakaway was formed right after the start, and included 's Salvatore Puccio, 's Björn Thurau, 's Mateusz Taciak and Team Poland's Paweł Franczak. The four riders built up an advantage that reached 4 minutes over the peloton controlled by  protecting the overall race leader, Petr Vakoč. Thurau took full points at the sprint in Głogów whilst Taciak took the mountain points available in Rzeszów. Just when it looked like he would take the stage victory, 's Theo Bos let go of Mezgec's wheel, passed him and ultimately beat Mezgec by half a bike length.

Stage 4

6 August 2014 — Tarnów to Katowice, 

This stage was the longest stage of the 71st Tour de Pologne, and was almost identical to stage 4 the previous year. There was some rolling terrain in the middle of the stage, yet none of the ascents were categorised. With the finish being on a downhill section of road by the Spodek arena, a sprint finish was expected to take place, with speeds reaching .

Multiple groups attempted to breakaway from the peloton in the first part of the stage, but none were successful. It was not until over 2 hours into the race a group was allowed to break. The group consisted of 's Josh Edmondson, 's Matthias Krizek and 's Mateusz Taciak. They built up an advantage over the peloton that topped four minutes. Later, Taciak took full points on both climbs, which resulted in him taking over the fuchsia jersey from teammate Maciej Paterski.

The trio were eventually caught with one lap to go, and a series of solo counterattacks took place to try and prevent a sprint finish. However, none of these were successful and the peloton prepared for a sprint finish. Vakoč kept his race lead whilst Krizek moved into second place, thanks to bonus seconds earned at the intermediate sprints.

Stage 5

7 August 2014 — Zakopane to Štrbské Pleso (Slovakia), 

The first stage to enter the mountains was also the first time the Tour visited Slovakia. Two of the ascents were part of a  loop around Štrbské Pleso. There were also two intermediate sprints, located in Liptovský Mikuláš and Liptovský Hrádok, as well as a special sprint in Suchá Hora, just across the Slovakian border. This stage was expected to turn the general classification around as the sprinters were expected to lose time and be replaced in the top 10 by climbers.

Unlike the previous stages, the break was formed just before reaching the Slovakian border, with eight riders making it into the breakaway. Team Poland's Paweł Bernas won the special sprint in Suchá Hora before the breakaway's lead topping four minutes. Later, Bernas also took both intermediate sprints, gaining six bonus seconds for the general classification. Paterski and 's Sebastian Lander attacked on the descent from the first category mountain, however they were soon caught by the rest of the breakaway which was extended to 16 riders. Christian Meier of  took full points at the second ascent of Štrbské Pleso before the group were caught.

Multiple solo attacks were attempted on the final climb, however none of these were successful. Towards the end, leader Petr Vakoč fell out of the peloton and started to lose time. The reduced peloton was prepared for a sprint finish which, to the delight of the home fans, was won by Rafał Majka, fresh from his win in the mountains classification in the Tour de France. Due to time bonuses, Majka advanced to 2nd place, one second behind Vakoč. Beñat Intxausti finished 2nd, ahead of teammate Ion Izagirre; they also advanced to 3rd and 4th overall, 5 and 7 seconds behind Vakoč respectively.

Stage 6

8 August 2014 — Terma Bukowina Tatrzańska to Bukowina Tatrzańska, 

As was customary in the previous editions of the race, the queen stage of the 2014 Tour de Pologne was a circuit race around Bukowina Tatrzańska. Each loop featured three climbs – a first category ascent to Ząb, with gradients reaching 11.5%, a first category ascent to Gliczarów Górny, with gradients reaching 21.5% and the final, uncategorised ascent to Bukowina Tatrzańska.

The day's breakaway was formed on the first ascent of Ząb and featured eight riders. The eight riders built an advantage that reached a maximum of four minutes.

Rafał Majka, who was second overall, attacked at the same time, and took a group of 10–15 riders with him. Leader Petr Vakoč fell back on the last climb to the finish, thus almost ensuring he would lose the yellow jersey. For the second day running, Beñat Intxausti finished 2nd, ahead of Ion Izagirre. The duo also rose to 2nd and 3rd in the general classification, 18 and 22 seconds behind Majka respectively, ahead of the final time trial.

Stage 7

9 August 2014 — Kraków to Kraków, individual time trial (ITT)

Like the previous year, the last stage was an intermediate time trial, starting and finishing in Kraków. For the first half of the race, the peloton headed south-east, before completing a U-turn in Wieliczka and heading north-west back to Kraków. It was expected that the general classification would be settled on this stage, however time trialists were expected to come first. As was customary of time trial stages, cyclists set off in reverse order from where they were ranked in the general classification at the end of the previous stage.

Bobridge set a time of 31' 10", but that was soon to be beaten by Rick Flens, who was 12 seconds faster, before both were beaten by 's Mateusz Taciak, with a time of 29' 57". Taciak held on for almost an hour and was beaten by Adriano Malori, who recorded 29' 21". With the stage being decided, the focus for the stage shifted towards the battle for the general classification and the overall victory.

Robert Gesink, sixth before the stage, dropped to eighth, being overtaken by Andrey Amador and Philip Deignan, who both recorded better times than Gesink. 's Przemysław Niemiec, meanwhile, was 31st in the time-trial, good enough to move him to fifth – a climb from eighth. Fourth placed Christophe Riblon managed to defend his position with a time of 29' 56", the ninth-best time of the day. Out of the top three, Majka was judged to be the weakest time trialist but had a lead on 18 seconds over Beñat Intxausti and 22 seconds over Ion Izagirre. Izagirre went first and recorded a time of 29' 47", fourth on the stage and the best from any rider in the top five. Intxausti, meanwhile, only recorded 30' 05"  whilst leader Majka stopped the clock in 30' 01". Therefore, he gained four seconds over Intxausti but lost fourteen to Izagirre. Still, this was good enough for him to take his first victory in a UCI World Tour race, to the delght of the home fans – he won the mountains classification in the Tour de France a mere two weeks before and was 6th in the Giro d'Italia earlier in the season. Izagirre, meanwhile, overtook his countryman Intxausti to come second, with Intxausti completing the podium.

Classification leadership table

Notes
 In stage 2, Roman Maikin, who was second in the points classification, wore the white jersey, because Yauheni Hutarovich (in first place) wore the yellow jersey as leader of the general classification during that stage.
 In stages 3 and 4, Jimmy Engoulvent, who was second in the most active rider classification, wore the blue jersey, because Petr Vakoč (in first place) wore the yellow jersey as leader of the general classification during those stages.

References

External links

Tour de Pologne
Tour de Pologne
Tour de Pologne
Tour de Pologne
August 2014 sports events in Europe